Cristina Castaño Gómez (born 30 October 1978) is a Spanish actress best known for her role as Judith Becker in hit series La que se avecina.

Biography
Castaño was born on 30 October 1978 in Vilalba (Lugo).

She made a name for herself in Galicia thanks to her role as Paula Barreiro in the Televisión de Galicia series Pratos combinados.

In 2000 she got the opportunity to join the cast of another series, this time a nationwide one called Al salir de clase (leaving class). It was a role for the summer, but she remained there until the end of the series, in 2002. Thus, she left Pratos combinados, leaving  her character to be played by María Castro, an actress with whom she would co-star with later in the film Días azules (Blue Days), and she became one of the most promising young actresses on Telecinco's series.

In 1999 she worked alongside Concha Velasco in the theatre play Las manzanas del viernes (The Apples of Friday).

She has since made cameos in some national series and has had small roles in films as well as theater projects, and has even tried her hand in the world of singing, participating in a live concert with Carlos Núñez and being the representative of Spain at the Viña del Mar International Song Festival in 2001 with Elvira Prado.

In 2005 she returned to TVG in another series, 4º sen ascensor (in Galician, Fourth [floor] Without Elevator).

From 2006 she worked in the musical Fame, with over 600 performances throughout Spain, and combined that with her work in Herederos.

She was a cast member in the Telecinco series La que se avecina as Judith Becker, a psychologist who gives therapy to all the neighbours in her block of flats, Mirador de Montepinar. She appeared from the 3rd season until the 9th, leaving the series in 2016.

She is the niece of radio announcer Pepe Domingo Castaño.

Filmography

References

External links

1978 births
Living people
Spanish film actresses
Spanish television actresses
21st-century Spanish actresses
Actresses from Galicia (Spain)